The World Group II Play-offs were four ties which involved the losing nations of the World Group II and four nations from the three Zonal Group I competitions. Nations that won their play-off ties entered the 2017 World Group II, while losing nations joined their respective zonal groups.

Serbia vs. Belgium

Slovakia vs. Canada

Poland vs. Chinese Taipei

Ukraine vs. Argentina

References 

World Group II Play-offs